Alan Arthur Rayson (26 October 1924 – 25 February 1982) was an Australian rules footballer who played for the Carlton Football Club and Geelong Football Club in the Victorian Football League (VFL).

Rayson's football career was interrupted by his service in the Royal Australian Air Force during World War II.

Notes

External links 

Alan Rayson's profile at Blueseum

1924 births
Carlton Football Club players
Geelong Football Club players
East Geelong Football Club players
Australian rules footballers from Geelong
1982 deaths
Royal Australian Air Force personnel of World War II
Military personnel from Victoria (Australia)